Kamenice is a municipality and village in Prague-East District in the Central Bohemian Region of the Czech Republic. It has about 4,800 inhabitants.

Administrative parts
Villages of Ládeves, Ládví, Nová Hospoda, Olešovice, Skuheř, Struhařov, Štiřín, Těptín and Všedobrovice are administrative parts of Kamenice.

Geography
It lies in the Benešov Uplands. The Kamenický Stream flows through the municipality and supplies several ponds.

History
The first written mention of Kamenice is from 1266, when there was a fortress. The village was owned by various owners until 1763, including the Lobkowicz family and Albrecht von Wallenstein. From 1763 until the establishent of a sovereign municipality, Kamenice was a property of Prague archbishops, who had rebuilt the local manor house into a castle, which served as their summer residence.

In 1820, the Ringhoffer family started a business in the territory, and the agricultural village began to be industrialized. František Ringhoffer purchased the Kamenice Castle in 1860 and the nearby Štiřín Castle in 1870, and had reconstructed both of them. Properties of the Ringhoffer family were confiscated in 1945.

Demographics
As of 2022, it is the 5th most populated municipality without the town status in the country and the most populated outside the Moravian-Silesian Region. In the 21st century, it belongs among the fastest growing municipalities in the country.

Sights

The Kamenice Castle was rebuilt in the English neo-Gothic style in 1875–1880 by the architect Jiří Stibral. Today it is privately owned and inaccessible. Next to the castle is located the Church of Saint Francis of Assisi. The originally early Gothic church was rebuilt in 1797 and modified into its current form in 1898.

The Štiřín Castle is a Baroque castle in the village of Štiřín. The original fortress was rebuilt into the castle at the end of the 18th century, and a castle park was founded. It was reconstructed by Jiří Stibral in 1900–1905. Today, the castle is used as a hotel and restaurant, and part of the park serves as a golf course.

Notable people
Che Guevara (1928–1967), Argentine revolutionary; lived in Ládví in 1966

References

External links

Villages in Prague-East District
Populated places in Prague-East District